Gaige Homestead is a historic home located at Duanesburg in Schenectady County, New York. The house was built about 1830 and is a rectangular two story, five bay frame building in a vernacular Federal style. It has a one-story, gable roofed side wing. It features a gable roof with cornice returns, a recessed central entrance, and two brick interior end chimneys.  Also on the property are two sheds, a carriage house, and a shop building.

The property was covered in a 1984 study of Duanesburg historical resources.
It was listed on the National Register of Historic Places in 1984.

References

Houses on the National Register of Historic Places in New York (state)
Houses in Schenectady County, New York
Federal architecture in New York (state)
Houses completed in 1830
1830 establishments in New York (state)
National Register of Historic Places in Schenectady County, New York